Cheonsa Bridge (Hangul: 천사대교) is a cross-sea bridge including a two main spans suspension bridge and an asymmetric cable-stayed bridge between Amtae Island and Aphae Island in the southwest coast of South Korea.

See also 
 Transportation in South Korea
 List of bridges in South Korea

References

External links

 

Suspension bridges in South Korea
Cable-stayed bridges in South Korea
Bridges completed in 2019
Road bridges